This article outlines the grammar of the Evenki language in both Cyrillic and Latin scripts.

Morphology notes

Vowel harmony 
Like other Tungusic languages, Evenki employs vowel harmony.

Nouns

Pluralization 
There are some rules of forming Evenki plurals:
 The plural suffixes -л (-l) after vowels or -ил (-il) after consonants are usually used.
бур (bur) : бурил (buril) "islands"
дю̄ (ʒū) : дю̄л (ʒul) "yurts"
 However, after -н (-n), -р (-r) is used instead and the final consonant before the suffix is removed.
орон (oron) : орор (oror) "deers"
 Some nouns use -сал (-sal) in addition to the previous two suffixes. Notice that this suffix also removes -н (-n) from the stem.
киран (kiran) : кирасал (kirasal) "eagles"
 There are also some irregular plurals of kinship terms:
амын (amin) : амтыл (amtil) "fathers"
эмын (emin) : эмтыл (emtil) "mothers"
акин (akin) : акнил (aknil) "older brothers"
экин (ekin) : экнил (eknil) "older sisters"
нэкун (nəkun) : нэкнил (nəknil) "younger brothers, younger sisters"
аса (asa) : асил (asil) "women"
хунаг (hunag) : хунил (hunil) "girls"

Cases 

Evenki nouns are inflected for 13 cases: nominative, accusative, accusative indefinite, dative, illative, locative, prosecutive (longitudinal), directional locative, directional prosecutive, deferred, initial, instrumental, and joint cases.

Possession 

Evenki nouns can also be inflected for possession, where a possessive suffix is attached to the noun based on features of the noun which possesses it.

References 

 

Grammars of specific languages
Tungusic languages